Radio Pulpit is an established, reliable, relevant media voice and preferred Christian radio station and partner in South Africa and beyond. With more than four decades of broadcasting experience, this trusted brand is a welcome voice in households and businesses across South Africa.

Broadcast languages
English
Afrikaans
Radio Pulpit has an LSM of 6-10 and broadcasts in multiple languages. These include 35% Afrikaans and 35% English. The remaining 30% consists of vernacular languages.

Broadcast time
24/7

Target audience
LSM groups 2–9
Age group 35-49
Christians

Coverage areas and frequencies 
National on 657 AM
DStv channel 882
Open View channel 607

Listenership figures

References

External links
Radiokansel Website
Radio Pulpit Website
SAARF Website
Sentech Website

Radio stations in South Africa
Christianity in South Africa